Hanna Rovina (‎; 15 September 1888 – 3 February 1980), also Robina, was an Israeli actress. She is often referred to as the "First Lady of Hebrew Theatre".

Biography
Hana Rovina was born in Byerazino, in the Igumensky Uyezd of the Minsk Governorate of the Russian Empire (present-day Belarus), to David Rubin, a timber merchant and Sarah-Rivka Rubin. She had one sister, Rahel and one brother, Zvi. She trained as a kindergarten teacher at a course for Hebrew-speaking kindergarten teachers in Warsaw (prior to the First World War).

She had a daughter, Ilana, born in 1934, with the Hebrew poet Alexander Penn.

Acting career
She began her acting career at the "Hebrew Stage Theatre" of Nahum Tzemach. She joined Habima Theatre in 1917 just as it was being launched, and participated in its first production, a play by Yevgeny Vakhtangov. She became famous for her role as Leah'le, the young bride who is possessed by a demon in The Dybbuk by S. Ansky.

In 1928, Rovina and the other actors of Habima immigrated to Mandate Palestine. Habima became the flagship of the new national theatre movement, and Rovina was recognized as the movement's leading actress. The image of Rovina in her role as Leah in the Moscow performance of The Dybbuk, in a white dress, with her long black braid, became an icon of the emergent Hebrew theatre.

Rovina took her acting  very seriously and tried to live the life of the character, as prescribed by the Stanislavski School.

Nisim Aloni wrote a play, Aunt Liza, especially for her and Rovina played the lead.

Rovina made high demands of her audience. She frequently stopped a play in the middle if she felt that the audience was not attentive enough. In one instance, she stopped the play Hannah Senesh in the middle of a  scene and told the teenagers in the hall to stop eating sunflower seeds.

Awards and recognition
Rovina was awarded the Israel Prize for theatre in 1956. She remained active on stage until her death, in 1980.  She died in Ra'anana, aged 91.

See also
Theater of Israel

References 

1880s births
1980 deaths
People from Berazino
People from Igumensky Uyezd
Belarusian Jews
Soviet Jews
Israeli Jews
Soviet emigrants to Mandatory Palestine
Jews in Mandatory Palestine
Israeli people of Belarusian-Jewish descent
Israeli stage actresses
Jewish Israeli actresses
Israel Prize in theatre recipients
Israel Prize women recipients
Burials at Kiryat Shaul Cemetery
Belarusian people of Israeli descent
Soviet people of Israeli descent